Mary Cohen may refer to:
 Mary Ann Cohen, American judge
 Mary M. Cohen, American social economist, journalist and proto-feminist
 Mary Ann Magnin, née Cohen, Dutch-American businesswoman